This is a list of the federal institutions of Brazil:

Legislative branch

National Congress, Congresso Nacional
Chamber of Deputies, Câmara dos Deputados 
Senate of Brazil, Senado Federal
Court of Audit of the Union, Tribunal de Contas da União (TCU)

Executive branch
Cabinet of Brazil, Gabinete Ministerial

Presidency of Brazil, Presidência da República
 National Defense Council, Conselho de Defesa Nacional (CDN)
 Cabinet of Institutional Security, Gabinete de Segurança Institucional (GSI)
 Chief of Staff, Casa Civil da Presidência da República
 National Antidrugs Secretariat, Secretaria Nacional Antidrogas (SENAD)
 Special Secretariat for Human Rights, Secretaria Especial dos Direitos Humanos (SEDH)
 General-Secretariat of the Presidency, Secretaria-Geral da Presidência (SG)
 Attorney General of the Union, Advocacia-Geral da União (AGU)
 Press Secretary, Secretaria de Comunicação Social (SeCom)
 Spokesman of the Presidency, Porta-Voz da Presidência
 Strategic Affairs Unit, Núcleo de Assuntos Estratégicos (NAE)

Vice-Presidency of Brazil, Vice-Presidência da República

Ministry of Agrarian Development, Ministério do Desenvolvimento Agrário

Instituto Nacional de Colonização e Reforma Agrária (INCRA)

Ministry of Agriculture, Livestock and Supply, Ministério da Agricultura, Pecuária e Abastecimento
Secretaria de Produção e Comercializão (SPC)
Secretaria de Defesa Agropecuária (SDA)
National Institute of Meteorology, Instituto Nacional de Meteorologia (INMET)

Ministry of Communications, Ministério das Comunicações (MC)
Brazilian Agency of Telecommunications, Agência Nacional de Telecomunicações (ANATEL)
Brazilian Post and Telegraph Corporation, Empresa Brasileira de Correios e Telégrafos (ECT)

Ministry of Culture, Ministério da Cultura (MinC)
Institute of National Historical and Artistic Heritage, Instituto do Patrimônio Histórico e Artístico Nacional (IPHAN)
National Cinema Agency, Agência Nacional do Cinema (Ancine)
House of Rui Barbosa Foundation, Fundação Casa de Rui Barbosa (FCRB)
Palmares Cultural Foundation, Fundação Cultural Palmares (FCP)
National Foundation of Arts, Fundação Nacional de Artes (Funarte)
National Library Foundation, Fundação Biblioteca Nacional (FBN)
National Museum of Brazil, Museu Nacional

Ministry of Defense, Ministério da Defesa (MD)
Brazilian Army, Exército Brasileiro (EB)
Brazilian Air Force, Força Aérea Brasileira (FAB)

Aeronautical Accidents Investigation and Prevention Center, Centro de Investigação e Prevenção de Acidentes Aeronáuticos (CENIPA)
Brazilian Navy, Marinha do Brasil (MB)
Linked entities
Brazilian Airport Infrastructure Company, Empresa Brasileira de Infraestrutura Aeroportuária (Infraero)
Higher War School, Escola Superior de Guerra (ESG)
Armed Forces Hospital, Hospital das Forças Armadas (HFA)
National Civil Aviation Agency, Agência Nacional de Aviação Civil

Ministry of Development, Industry and Foreign Trade, Ministério do Desenvolvimento, Indústria e Comércio Exterior (MDIC)
National Institute of Metrology, Standardization and Industrial Quality (Brazil) Instituto Nacional de Metrologia, Normalização e Qualidade Industrial, (INMETRO)
National Institute of Industrial Property Instituto Nacional da Propriedade Industrial (INPI)
National Bank for Economic and Social Development Banco Nacional de Desenvolvimento Econômico e Social (BNDES)

Ministry of Education, Ministério da Educação (MEC)
National Institute of Educational Studies and Researches, Instituto Nacional de Estudos e Pesquisas Educacionais (INEP)
National Council of Education, Conselho Nacional da Educação
Joaquim Nabuco Foundation, Fundação Joaquim Nabuco
Federal Centers of Technological Education, Centros Federais de Educação Tecnológica (CEFETS)
Federal agrotechnical schools, Escolas agrotécnicas federais
Federal universities

Ministry of the Environment, Ministério do Meio Ambiente (MMA)
Councils and commissions
 Conselho Nacional do Meio Ambiente (CONAMA)
 Conselho Nacional da Amazônia Legal (CONAMAZ)
 Conselho Nacional de Recursos Hídricos
 Conselho Deliberativo do Fundo Nacional do Meio Ambiente
 Conselho de Gestão do Patrimônio Genético
 Comissão de Gestão de Florestas Públicas
 Comissão Nacional de Florestas (CONAFLOR)
 Serviço Florestal Brasileiro (SFB)

Linked entities
 Agência Nacional de Águas (ANA)
 Brazilian Institute of Environment and Renewable Natural Resources, Instituto Brasileiro do Meio Ambiente e dos Recursos Naturais Renováveis (IBAMA)
 Instituto Chico Mendes de Conservação da Biodiversidade
 Instituto de Pesquisas Jardim Botânico do Rio de Janeiro (JBRJ)
 Companhia de Desenvolvimento de Barcarena (CODEBAR)

Ministry of Foreign Affairs, Ministério das Relações Exteriores (MRE/Itamaraty)
Rio Branco Institute, Instituto Rio Branco (IRBr)
Alexandre de Gusmão Foundation, Fundação Alexandre de Gusmão (FUNAG)

Ministry of Economy, Ministério da Economia
Secretariats
Secretaria-Executiva
Subsecretaria de Planejamento Orçamento e Administração
Secretaria de Acompanhamento Econômico (SEAE)
Secretaria de Assuntos Internacionais
Secretaria de Política Econômica
Secretariat of Federal Revenue of Brazil, Secretaria da Receita Federal do Brasil
Secretariat of National Treasury, Secretaria do Tesouro Nacional

Collegiate Organs
 Conselho Monetário Nacional
 Conselho Nacional de Política Fazendária
 Conselho de Recursos do Sistema Financeiro Nacional
 Conselho Nacional de Seguros Privados
 Conselho de Recursos do Sistema Nacional de Seguros Privados, de Previdência Privada Aberta e de Capitalização
 Council for Financial Activities Control, Conselho de Controle de Atividades Financeiras (COAF)
 Câmara Superior de Recursos Fiscais
 Conselhos de Contribuintes
 Comitê Brasileiro de Nomenclatura
 Comitê de Avaliação de Créditos ao Exterior
 Comitê de Coordenação Gerencial das Instituições Financeiras Públicas Federais

Linked entities
Autarchies:
 Central Bank of Brazil, Banco Central do Brasil
 Comissão de Valores Mobiliários
 Superintendência de Seguros Privados

Public companies:
 Casa da Moeda do Brasil
 Serviço Federal de Processamento de Dados
 Caixa Econômica Federal
 Empresa Gestora de Ativos

Mixed economy companies:
 Banco do Brasil
 Brasil Resseguros
 Banco da Amazônia
 Banco do Nordeste do Brasil
 Banco do Estado do Piaui
 Banco do Estado de Santa Catarina
 BESC Crédito Imobiliário (BESCRI)

Ministry of Health, Ministério da Saúde (MS)

Ministry of Justice, Ministério da Justiça (MJ)
State Secretariat for Human Rights, Secretaria de Estado dos Direitos Humanos (SEDH)
National Secretariat of Justice, Secretaria Nacional de Justiça
National Prison Department, Departamento Penitenciário Nacional (DEPEN)
Department of Foreigners, Departamento de Estrangeiros (DEEST) 
National Secretariat of Public Security, Secretaria Nacional de Segurança Pública (SENASP)
Secretariat for Economic Rights, Secretaria de Direito Econômico (SDE)
Department of Consumer Protection and Defence, Departamento de Proteção e Defesa do Consumidor (DPDC)
Department of Economic Protection and Defence, Departamento de Proteção e Defesa Econômico (DPDE)
Secretariat for Legislative Affairs, Secretaria de Assuntos Legislativos (SAL)
Federal Police Department, Departamento de Polícia Federal (DPF)
Department of the Federal Highway Police, Departamento de Polícia Rodoviária Federal (DPRF)
Departamento Nacional de Trânsito (DENATRAN)

Ministry of Labor and Employment, Ministério do Trabalho e Emprego
 
 Board of Trustees of the Guarantee Fund Service Time, Conselho Curador do Fundo de Garantia do Tempo de Serviço
 Advisory Board of the Fund for Workers, Conselho Deliberativo do Fundo de Amparo ao Trabalhador
 National Council for Solidarity Economy, Conselho Nacional de Economia Solidária
 National Immigration Council, Conselho Nacional de Imigração
 National Labour Council, Conselho Nacional do Trabalho
 Legal Advice, Consultoria Jurídica
 Jorge Duprat Figueiredo Foundation, Safety and Occupational Health, Fundação Jorge Duprat Figueiredo, de Segurança e Medicina do Trabalho
 Office of the Minister, Gabinete do Ministro
 Ombudsman General, Ouvidoria-Geral
 Bureau of Labor Inspection, Secretaria de Inspeção do Trabalho
 Department of Public Employment Policies, Secretaria de Políticas Públicas de Emprego
 Bureau of Labor Relations, Secretaria de Relações do Trabalho
 National Secretariat for Solidarity Economy, Secretaria Nacional de Economia Solidária
 Executive Secretary, Secretaria-Executiva
 Regional superintendencies:
 Alagoas
 Goiás
 Mato Grosso
 Mato Grosso do Sul
 Minas Gerais
 Pernambuco
 Rondônia
 Roraima
 Santa Catarina
 São Paulo
 Sergipe
 Tocantins
 Bahia
 Paraíba
 Acre
 Amapá
 Amazonas
 Ceará
 Distrito Federal
 Espírito Santo
 Maranhão
 Pará
 Paraná
 Piauí
 Rio de Janeiro
 Rio Grande do Norte

Ministry of National Integration, Ministério da Integração Nacional
Departamento Nacional de Obras Contra as Secas (DNOCS)

Ministry of Planning, Budget and Management, Ministério do Planejamento, Orçamento e Gestão
Brazilian Institute of Geography and Statistics, Instituto Brasileiro de Geografia e Estatística (IBGE)
Institute of Applied Economic Research, Instituto de Pesquisa Econômica Aplicada (IPEA)

Ministry of Science and Technology, Ministério da Ciência e Tecnologia (MCT)
Brazilian Space Agency, Agência Espacial Brasileira (AEB)
National Institute for Space Research, Instituto Nacional de Pesquisas Espaciais (INPE)
National Nuclear Energy Commission, Comissão Nacional de Energia Nuclear (CNEN)
National Institute of Amazonian Research, Instituto Nacional de Pesquisas da Amazônia (INPA)
National Institute of Technology, Instituto Nacional de Tecnologia (INT)
National Council of Scientific and Technological Development, Conselho Nacional de Desenvolvimento Científico e Tecnológico (CNPq)
Brazilian Institute of Information in Science and Technology, Instituto Brasileiro de Informação em Ciência e Tecnologia (IBICT) 
Institute for Pure and Applied Mathematics, Instituto Nacional de Matemática Pura e Aplicada (IMPA)
Brazilian Centre of Physics Research, Centro Brasileiro de Pesquisas Físicas (CBPF)
Centre of Mineral Technology Centro de Tecnologia Mineral (CETEM)
National Laboratory of Astrophysics, Laboratório Nacional de Astrofísica (LNA)
National Laboratory of Scientific Computing, Laboratório Nacional de Computação Científica (LNCC)
National Laboratory of Light Synchrotron, Laboratório Nacional de Luz Síncrotron (LNLS) 
National Technical Commission of Biosecurity, Comissão Técnica Nacional de Biossegurança (CTNBio)
Renato Archer Research Center, Centro de Pesquisas Renato Archer (CPRA)

Ministry of Social Welfare and Security, Ministério de Previdência e Assistência Social (MPAS)
National Institute of Social Security, Instituto Nacional do Seguro Social (INSS)

Ministry of Sports, Ministério do Esporte
National Institute of Sport Development, Instituto Nacional de Desenvolvimento do Desporto

Ministry of Tourism, Ministério do Turismo
Brazilian Tourism Agency, Empresa Brasileira de Turismo (Embratur)

Ministry of Transportation, Ministério dos Transportes
Departamento Nacional de Infraestrutura de Transporte (DNIT)

Judicial branch

Administrative organs
 National Justice Council
 Federal Council of Justice Conselho da Justiça Federal (CJF)

Supreme Court
Supreme Federal Court, Supremo Tribunal Federal (STF)

Superior courts
 Superior Court of Labor, Tribunal Superior do Trabalho (TST)
 Superior Military Court, Superior Tribunal Militar (STM)
 Superior Electoral Court Tribunal Superior Eleitoral (TSE)
 Superior Court of Justice, Superior Tribunal de Justiça (STJ)

Second instance Courts
Regional Labor Courts
Regional Electoral Courts
Regional Federal Courts
Regional Military Courts
Regional State Courts

First instance courts
Labor Courts
Electoral Courts
Federal Courts
Military Courts
Municipal Courts

Other court
 Court of Justice of the Federal District and the Territories Tribunal de Justiça do Distrito Federal e dos Territórios (TJDFT)

Public Ministry of the Union
Federal Prosecution Service, Ministério Público Federal (MPF)
Labor Public Ministry, Ministério Público do Trabalho (MPT)
Military Public Ministry, Ministério Público Militar (MPM)

See also

List of Brazilian government enterprises
List of regulatory organs of Brazil
Brazilian Public Service

References
Sistema de Informações Organizacionais do Governo Federal SIORG

Federal institutions